Shuko Aoyama and Ena Shibahara were the defending champions, but they decided not to participate this year.

Nadiia Kichenok and Raluca Olaru won the title, defeating Kaitlyn Christian and Sabrina Santamaria in the final, 2–6, 6–3, [10–8].

Seeds

Draw

References

External Links
 Main Draw

St. Petersburg Ladies' Trophy - Doubles
St. Petersburg Ladies' Trophy